Tes-Khemsky District is an administrative and municipal district (raion, or kozhuun), one of the seventeen in the Tuva Republic, Russia. It is located in the south of the republic. Its administrative center is the rural locality (a selo) of Samagaltay. Its population was  8,908 (2002 Census);  The population of Samagaltay accounts for 39.6% of the district's total population.

References

Notes

Sources

Districts of Tuva

pl:Kożuun barun-chiemczycki